John R. Hamilton may refer to:

 John R. Hamilton (photographer) (1923–1997), American photographer
 John R. Hamilton (architect), English-American architect
 John Ronald Hamilton (1871–1940), New Zealand politician